Romance is a 2004 compilation album by American singer Frank Sinatra, that consists of 50 romantic tunes.

Track listing

Disc one
 "Strangers in the Night" (Bert Kaempfert, Charles Singleton, Eddie Snyder) - 2:25
 "Somethin' Stupid" (with Nancy Sinatra) (Carson Parks) - 2:45
 "Let's Fall in Love" (Harold Arlen, Ted Koehler) - 2:11
 "I've Got a Crush on You" (George Gershwin, Ira Gershwin) - 2:16
 "Something" (George Harrison) - 3:34
 "Night and Day" (Cole Porter) - 3:37
 "The Way You Look Tonight" (Dorothy Fields, Jerome Kern) - 3:22
 "I Get a Kick Out of You" (Porter) - 3:14
 "Moon River" (Henry Mancini, Johnny Mercer) - 3:20
 "Come Fly with Me" (live) (Sammy Cahn, Jimmy Van Heusen) - 3:45
 "Come Rain or Come Shine" (Arlen, Mercer) - 4:06
 "Love's Been Good to Me" (Rod McKuen) - 3:27
 "Misty" (Erroll Garner, Johnny Burke) - 2:41
 "More (Theme from Mondo Cane)" (Riz Ortolani, Nino Oliviero, Marcello Ciorciolini, Norman Newell) - 3:05
 "You and the Night and the Music" (Arthur Schwartz, Howard Dietz) - 2:36
 "September Song" (Kurt Weill, Maxwell Anderson) - 3:30
 "Cycles" (Gayle Caldwell) - 3:07
 "The Best is Yet to Come" (Cy Coleman, Carolyn Leigh) - 3:10
 "East of the Sun (And West of the Moon)" (Brooks Bowman) - 3:26
 "You'd Be So Easy to Love" (Porter) - 2:24
 "When Somebody Loves You" (Cahn, Van Heusen) - 1:54
 "I Love You" (Porter) - 2:16
 "Gentle On My Mind" (John Hartford) - 3:25
 "It Had to Be You" (Isham Jones, Gus Kahn) - 3:53
 "Let's Face the Music and Dance" (Irving Berlin) - 2:58

Disc two
 "A Fine Romance" (Fields, Kern) - 2:11
 "I've Got You Under My Skin" (Porter) - 3:26
 "Have You Met Miss Jones?" (Richard Rodgers, Lorenz Hart) - 2:30
 "Fly Me to the Moon (In Other Words)" (Bart Howard) - 2:30
 "My Funny Valentine" (Rodgers, Hart) - 2:31
 "What Is This Thing Called Love?" (Porter) - 2:35
 "Bewitched, Bothered and Bewildered" (Rodgers, Hart) - 3:02
 "Call Me Irresponsible" (Cahn, Van Heusen) - 3:12
 "I'm Beginning to See the Light" (Johnny Hodges, Harry James, Duke Ellington, Don George) - 2:34
 "The Very Thought of You" (Ray Noble) - 3:34
 "Summer Wind" (Heinz Meier, Hans Bradtke, Mercer) - 2:53
 "Like Someone in Love" (Van Heusen, Burke) - 3:10
 "Quiet Nights of Quiet Stars" (Antonio Carlos Jobim, Gene Lees) - 2:45
 "Desafinado" (Jon Hendricks, Jobim, Newton Mendonça) - 3:00
 "Wave" (Jobim) - 3:25
 "Watch What Happens" (Norman Gimbel, Michel Lengrand) - 2:17
 "I Have Dreamed" (Rodgers, Oscar Hammerstein II) - 3:01
 "I Only Have Eyes for You" (Harry Warren, Al Dubin) - 3:31
 "Love Walked In" (G. Gershswin, I. Gershwin) - 2:19
 "It's Always You" (Van Heusen, Burke) - 2:49
 "They Can't Take That Away from Me" (G. Gerswhin, I. Gershwin) - 2:41
 "The Look of Love" (Cahn, Van Heusen) - 2:43
 "Call Me" (Tony Hatch) - 3:07
 "It Was a Very Good Year" (Ervin Drake) - 4:25
 "All the Way" (Cahn, Van Heusen) (w/Celine Dion) - 3:53

Personnel
Frank Sinatra - vocals
Nancy Sinatra - vocals
Celine Dion - vocals
Antonio Carlos Jobim - vocals, guitar

2004 compilation albums
Frank Sinatra compilation albums